Maurits Lammertink (born 31 August 1990 in Enter, Netherlands) is a Dutch cyclist, who currently rides for UCI WorldTeam  in road racing, and UCI Cyclo-cross team Tormans, in cyclo-cross. In 2016, he won the overall classification of the Tour de Luxembourg ahead of Philippe Gilbert and Alex Kirsch. In June 2017, he was named in the startlist for the Tour de France. In May 2018, he was named in the startlist for the Giro d'Italia.

His younger brother Steven Lammertink also competed professionally as a cyclist, until retiring in 2019.

Major results

2011
 1st Stage 4 Czech Cycling Tour
 2nd Road race, National Under-23 Road Championships
 3rd Eschborn-Frankfurt City Loop U23
 9th Arno Wallaard Memorial
2012
 1st  Overall Carpathia Couriers Path
1st  Points classification
1st Stage 1
 1st  Mountains classification Oberösterreich Rundfahrt
 3rd Eschborn-Frankfurt City Loop U23
 7th Rund um Köln
2013
 5th Overall Ster ZLM Toer
 8th Eschborn-Frankfurt – Rund um den Finanzplatz
 9th Ronde van Drenthe
2014
 1st Circuit de Wallonie
 3rd Overall Dookoła Mazowsza
1st  Points classification
1st Stage 5
 3rd Ronde van Overijssel
 4th Rabo Baronie Breda Classic
 5th Overall Czech Cycling Tour
1st Stage 4
 9th Grand Prix des Marbriers
2015
 2nd Coppa Sabatini
 4th Druivenkoers Overijse
 5th Overall Tour du Limousin
1st Stage 4
 8th Brabantse Pijl
 8th Gran Premio Bruno Beghelli
2016
 1st  Overall Tour de Luxembourg
1st  Young rider classification
 7th Brabantse Pijl
 8th Eschborn-Frankfurt – Rund um den Finanzplatz
2017
 6th Overall Tour of Belgium
1st Stage 4
 6th Overall Tour de Yorkshire
2018
 8th Cadel Evans Great Ocean Road Race
 10th Road race, UEC European Road Championships
2019
 2nd Overall Tour de Luxembourg
 6th Overall ZLM Tour
 8th Famenne Ardenne Classic
 10th Brabantse Pijl
2020
 2nd Paris–Camembert
 6th Giro dell'Appennino
 9th Paris–Tours
2021
 9th Trofeo Calvia

Grand Tour general classification results timeline

References

External links

1990 births
Living people
Dutch male cyclists
Cyclo-cross cyclists
People from Wierden
Cyclists from Overijssel